Wilton is a parish in the Scottish Borders area of Scotland, comprising the part of Hawick north of the Teviot. Formerly a separate burgh, it was merged with the burgh of Hawick in the 19th century. It stretches from Wilton Dean in the south-west to Burnfoot in the north-east.

See also
List of places in the Scottish Borders
List of places in Scotland

Villages in the Scottish Borders
Parishes in Roxburghshire